Christopher Arkwright (born 8 February 1959) is an English former professional rugby league footballer who played in the 1970s, 1980s and 1990s.

Playing career

St Helens
Arkwright played  in St. Helens 0–16 defeat by Warrington in the 1982–83 Lancashire Cup Final during the 1982–83 season at Central Park, Wigan on 23 October 1982, and played  in the 28–16 victory over Wigan in the 1984–85 Lancashire Cup Final during the 1984–85 season at Central Park, Wigan on Sunday 28 October 1984.

Arkwright played , and was captain in St Helens' 18–19 defeat by Halifax in the 1986–87 Challenge Cup Final during the 1986–87 season at Wembley Stadium, London on 2 May 1987.

Arkwright missed most of the 1988–89 season due to injury. He required a knee operation towards the end of the 1987–88 season, and suffered an injury to his other knee during his recovery while playing for the reserve team.

Runcorn Highfield
Arkwright was signed by Runcorn Highfield in October 1990. The transfer fee was set by a tribunal, with Runcorn paying Saints an initial £4,000, plus an additional £2,000 based on future appearances for the club.

In April 1991, he was appointed as player-coach at the club, but quit the role a few months later. He returned to the club (now known as Highfield) as a player in December 1991.

He took charge for a second spell as coach in 1994. He resigned at the end of the 1994–95 season.

International honours
Arkwright won a cap for England while at St. Helens in 1984 against Wales (sub), and won caps for Great Britain while at St. Helens in 1985 against New Zealand (sub) (2 matches).

Personal life
Arkwright is the son of the St Helens and Warrington  of the 1960s, John Arkwright, Jr., and the grandson of the rugby league footballer, John "Jack" Arkwright.

References

External links
Profile at saints.org.uk

1959 births
Living people
Rugby league players from St Helens, Merseyside
English rugby league players
Rugby league centres
Rugby league five-eighths
Rugby league locks
St Helens R.F.C. captains
St Helens R.F.C. players
Liverpool City (rugby league) players
Liverpool City coaches
England national rugby league team players
Great Britain national rugby league team players
Lancashire rugby league team players